Adriana Aparecida dos Santos (born 18 January 1971) is a Brazilian former basketball player. As part of the national team, Adriana was world champion in the 1994 FIBA World Championship for Women, and appeared in three Olympic Games, Barcelona 1992, Atlanta 1996, and Sydney 2000, winning silver and bronze in the latter two.

References

External links 
 
 
 

1971 births
Living people
Brazilian women's basketball players
Olympic basketball players of Brazil
Basketball players at the 1991 Pan American Games
Basketball players at the 1992 Summer Olympics
Basketball players at the 1996 Summer Olympics
Basketball players at the 2000 Summer Olympics
Olympic silver medalists for Brazil
Olympic bronze medalists for Brazil
Olympic medalists in basketball
Sportspeople from São Paulo (state)
Medalists at the 2000 Summer Olympics
Medalists at the 1996 Summer Olympics
Oath takers at the Olympic Games
Pan American Games medalists in basketball
Pan American Games gold medalists for Brazil
Medalists at the 1991 Pan American Games